Susanna Zorzi (born 13 March 1992) is an Italian former racing cyclist.

Major results

2009
 3rd  Road race, UCI Juniors World Championships
2010
 5th Road race, UCI Juniors Road World Championships
2012
 1st Stage 3 Trophée d'Or Féminin
 10th Memorial Davide Fardelli
2013
 1st  Road race, UEC European Under-23 Road Championships
2014
 3rd  Team time trial, UCI Road World Championships
 5th Overall The Women's Tour
 5th Giro del Trentino Alto Adige-Südtirol
 6th Time trial, UEC European Under-23 Road Championships
 6th 7-Dorpenomloop Aalburg
 8th Overall Tour de Bretagne Féminin
 10th Overall Vuelta Internacional Femenina a Costa Rica
1st  Young rider classification
2015
 9th Gent–Wevelgem
2016
 7th Overall Giro del Trentino Alto Adige-Südtirol
 9th Omloop Het Nieuwsblad
2017
 6th Cadel Evans Great Ocean Road Race
 10th Overall Women's Tour Down Under

See also
 2014 Astana BePink Women's Team season

References

External links

 

1992 births
Living people
Italian female cyclists
Cyclists from the Province of Vicenza
People from Thiene